Bakhtino is a rural locality (a village) in Andreyevskoye Rural Settlement, Sudogodsky District, Vladimir Oblast, Russia. The population was 2 as of 2010.

Geography 
Bakhtino is located 38 km northeast of Sudogda (the district's administrative centre) by road. Kartmazovo is the nearest rural locality.

References 

Rural localities in Sudogodsky District
Sudogodsky Uyezd